Gokieli is a Georgian surname. Notable people with the surname include:

Elene Gokieli (1918–1992), Georgian hurdler
Jemal Gokieli (1920–1991), Georgian conductor

Georgian-language surnames